Nematini is a tribe of common sawflies in the family Tenthredinidae. There are about 14 genera and at least 30 described species in Nematini.

Genera
These 14 genera belong to the tribe Nematini:

 Amauronematus Konow, 1890 g b
 Anoplonyx Marlatt, 1896 g b
 Craesus Leach, 1817 g b
 Craterocercus Rohwer, 1911 g b
 Euura Newman, 1837 g b
 Hemichroa Stephens, 1835 i c g b
 Hoplocampa Hartig, 1837 i c g b
 Nematus Panzer, 1801 i c g b (willow sawflies)
 Neopareophora b
 Pachynematus Konow, 1890 i c g b
 Phyllocolpa Benson, 1960 i c g b
 Pikonema Ross, 1937 i c g b
 Pontania Costa, 1859 i c g b
 Pristiphora Latreille, 1810 i c g b

Data sources: i = ITIS, c = Catalogue of Life, g = GBIF, b = Bugguide.net

References

Further reading

External links

 

Tenthredinidae
Hymenoptera tribes